The 1978 European Cup Winners' Cup Final was a football match contested between Anderlecht of Belgium and Austria Wien of Austria. It was the final match of the 1977–78 European Cup Winners' Cup and the 18th European Cup Winners' Cup final. The final was held at Parc des Princes in Paris, France, on 3 May 1978. The venue was selected in Bern by the UEFA Executive Committee on 20 September 1977). Anderlecht won the match 4–0 thanks to two goals each by Rob Rensenbrink and Gilbert van Binst.

It was Anderlecht's third consecutive appearance in the final; they won the competition in 1976 and were runners-up in 1977.

Route to the final

Match details

See also
1978 European Cup Final
1978 UEFA Cup Final
R.S.C. Anderlecht in European football

References

External links
UEFA Cup Winners' Cup results at Rec.Sport.Soccer Statistics Foundation
1978 European Cup Winners' Cup Final at UEFA.com

3
Cup Winners' Cup Final 1978
Cup Winners' Cup Final 1978
UEFA Cup Winners' Cup Finals
International club association football competitions hosted by Paris
UEFA
UEFA
1978 in Paris
May 1978 sports events in Europe